Samuel Schwarz (born 22 August 1983) is a German speed skater. He finished sixth in the men's 1000 metres event at the 2013 World Single Distance Championships.

References

1983 births
German male speed skaters
Speed skaters at the 2010 Winter Olympics
Speed skaters at the 2014 Winter Olympics
Olympic speed skaters of Germany
Speed skaters from Berlin
Living people
21st-century German people